Noble's leaf-toed gecko (Phyllodactylus magister) is a species of gecko. It is endemic to Peru.

References

Phyllodactylus
Reptiles of Peru
Reptiles described in 1924